Hussainabad is a town and a sub division in Palamu district in the Indian state of Jharkhand.

Demographics

Hussainabad had a population of 23,433. Males constitute 53% of the population and females 47%. Hussainabad has an average literacy rate of 54%, lower than the national average of 59.5%: male literacy is 62%, and female literacy is 45%. In Hussainabad, 18% of the population is under 6 years of age. India census,

History
Hussainabad have a well versed history.The zamindars of this region were the warrior class  of hindu.Once,these rajputs had 50000 bigha of land.The most renowned personality of this region was Biseswar dayal singh of babhandih.He was active in politics and freedom struggle.These rajputs still have a clout in the region and are feared by the other people.The royal martial race of mahthans are prosperous and dominate the politics of this region.The present landlordship  of this region is in hands of bijendra prasad singh.He is most respected among all men in the region.The Mahthan house which was last renovated in 1967 is his current residence.The next heir of the landlordship is subodh singh.

Rajputs have dominated this region since 16th century and have never bowed to nawabs.The prominent rajput villages of this region are Babhandih,kamgarpur,kachra and Emaliyatikar, Chirayakhar.

Geography

Hussainabad (Japla) is a small town in Jharkhand serving as the main market for nearby villages. It is on the border of Jharkhand and Bihar. The Railway station is called 'Japla'. Towards the Bihar from Japla, the following stations are Kajratnawadih and Nabinagar. Railway is the main source for intercity commutation but local buses and small vehicles also operate between nearby cities.

Approximately 4 km from Japla is Sone Valley Cements Limited (formerly known as Sone Valley Port Land Cement Company Limited), on the bank of Sone river, which ceased operating in 1993. It was first Portland cement factory of India established during British regime. It is said that the Mohraon Bungalow of Sone valley Cements was among some of the finest bungalows in the state of Bihar, and equipped with modern amenities. After the closure of the factory, the bungalow became dilapidated. Initial economic growth in Japla could be attributed to the cement factory, whose employees visited town to purchase goods for day-to-day needs, thus promoting the town's trade and commerce. The town now serves as the main market for nearby villages.

Infrastructure
In the absence of governmental help for improvement, Japla has only a basic infrastructure. Roads are single carriageway, sewerage is non-existent, and the water supply is irregular.

Basic medical facilities are provided by a government-run health centre and private medical practitioners. For advance treatment patients either travel to the nearby town  or to larger cities such as DALTONGANJ, Varanasi and Ranchi.

The condition of electricity supply is better than nearby towns with less than 5 hours power cut in a day. Solar power is also used for street lighting and domestic purposes.

The preferred public conveyance within in the town is man-pulled rickshaw, auto-rickshaw and jeep.

The outskirts of town are infested with naxalites because of surrounding dense jungle.

Japla's educational infrastructure is basic. There are government run schools for boys and girls and small private schools. For higher education students migrate to larger cities. Some residents of Japla are well-placed and are doing well in big cities. People from japla are working in IBM, TCS, Infosys and multinational banks.

The major source of income of townspeople is in small trading businesses and agriculture. The people of the villages surrounding the town engage in agriculture. The government is the biggest employer with the majority of the jobs coming from banks, schools and Government offices.

Amenities in Japla include the nationalised banks of SBI and PNB, a post office, two petrol pumps, and picture halls.

See also
 Jharkhand
 Jharkhand Legislative Assembly
 Palamu
 Palamu Loksabha constituency

References

Cities and towns in Palamu district